Silda is an uninhabited island in Loppa Municipality in Troms og Finnmark county, Norway. The  island lies in the Lopphavet Sea, north of the villages of Bergsfjord and Sør-Tverrfjord on the mainland. The name of the island may be derived from the Norwegian words for "seal" or "herring".

Archaeological findings on the islands include farm mounds, traces of houses, burial cairns from the Iron Age and Middle Ages.

See also
List of islands of Norway

References

Loppa
Uninhabited islands of Norway
Islands of Troms og Finnmark